A plate burner is part of the CTF print workflow.  In a CTF workflow, a sheet of light sensitive film is imaged directly from a RIP. The film must then be developed immediately afterwards.  This film is then placed onto a printing plate, on the plate burner.  Registration of the plate and film is controlled by a pin grid.  After securing the plate and film to the grid, a glass cover is lowered upon the plate and film.  The film and plate are placed into a vacuum on the plate burner to remove any pockets of air and ensure the film is in close contact with the surface of the printing plate.  Once the vacuum is established, a high power (5 kW) UV lamp (also associated with the burner) is turned on, which "burns" an image through the film and onto the plate.  The plate is then processed, and put onto the offset printing press.

Printing